Copelatus imasakai is a species of diving beetle. It is part of the genus Copelatus in the subfamily Copelatinae of the family Dytiscidae. It was described by Matsui & Kitayama in 2000.

References

imasakai
Beetles described in 2000